Anne Louise, Duchess of Noailles (1632–22 May 1697), was a French courtier. She served as dame d'atour to the queen dowager of France, Anne of Austria, from 1657 until 1666.

The daughter of Antoine Boyer, Lord of Sainte-Geneviève-des-Bois, Louise married Anne de Noailles, who became the first Duke of Noailles in 1646. He predeceased her, dying on 15 February 1678. She did not remarry and died on 22 May 1697.

She had two notable children:
Anne Jules de Noailles, 2nd Duke of Noailles (1650–1708) and Marshal of France, married Marie-Françoise de Bournonville.
Louis Antoine de Noailles, cardinal de Noailles (1651–1729), never married.

Notes

References

1632 births
1697 deaths
17th-century French women
French duchesses
Duchesses of Noailles
House of Noailles
French ladies-in-waiting
Court of Louis XIV